Markus Reiter (born 10 August 1976) is a German football manager and former player. Before his career as coach, Reiter played as a defender for MSV Duisburg, Borussia Mönchengladbach and SpVgg Greuther Fürth in the Bundesliga and 2. Bundesliga. He retired as a player in 2001, at the age of 25.

Honours
MSV Duisburg
DFB-Pokal: runner-up 1997–98

References

External links

1976 births
Living people
Footballers from Essen
German footballers
Association football defenders
Germany youth international footballers
Germany under-21 international footballers
Bundesliga players
2. Bundesliga players
MSV Duisburg players
Borussia Mönchengladbach players
SpVgg Greuther Fürth players
German football managers
Rot-Weiss Essen managers